Heat shock protein 90kDa alpha (cytosolic), class A member 2, also known as HSP90AA2, is a human gene.  The protein encoded by this gene belongs to the Hsp90 family of heat shock proteins.

References